Juvana 2: Terperangkap Dalam Kebebasan (English: Juvenile 2: Trapped in Freedom) is an action film directed by Faisal Ishak. The film follows the life of three former students — Botak, Daim and Ayam; after released from their sentence and began a new life without world of crime. But all their effort drawn into nothingness after all their families involved on crimes and kidnapped by Tok Ki, forcing these young men to save their families. The film premiered on October 29, 2015.

Plot
The film follows the life of three former students, Botak, Daim and Ayam who adapt to the outside world as soon as their sentence ends. The storyline began after they were released early after rescuing the civilians during the riot at Indera Sakti School triggered by Lan Todak, the gangster who had been hostile to them once the former Wira Bakti students were transferred to the school.

They then have been determined to change their lives and do not want to be involved with the world of crime. Botak began to live with his father, while Ayam also began his life by supporting the lives of his siblings. At the same time, Daim also intends to continue his studies at the University of Malaya in the field of lawsuit and start a new life with his girlfriend, Sara, who often stated spending time hanging out with his colleagues for avoiding Daim to reminiscent of his memorable memories during detention. However, their expectations for a better future are also not as easy as they would expect.

Botak's father was a drug addict, while Ayam brother became friends with gangster gang known as Geng Jebat. Then, the fate of these three friends worsens when their loved ones become victims of the tyrannical Tok Ki's unnoticed motives, forcing these young men to work hard to save them. Finally, only one person can help them. Their last path is that only one can afford to seek help for their freedom from the shackles of their past tale.

Cast
 Johan As'ari as Botak
 Zahiril Adzim as Daim
 Adam Shahz as Ayam
 Pekin Ibrahim as Tok Ki
 Hasnul Rahmat as Encik Raja
 Shera Aiyob as Sara
 Farhanna Qismina as Midah
 Eyka Farhana as Nadia
 Hafreez Adam as Megat
 Nad Zainal as Nabila
 Zaidi Omar as Tok Penghulu
 Khairul Mohamed as Komeng@Ain
 Idzham Ismail as Panjang
 Megat Fazeril Faiz as Kicap

References

External links
 

Malaysian action films
Malay-language films
2015 films
Filmscape films
Films produced by Kabir Bhatia
Films directed by Faisal Ishak